Heat shock 70kDa protein 12A also known as HSPA12A is a human gene.  The protein encoded by this gene is a member of the Hsp70 family of heat shock proteins.

References

External links 
 

Heat shock proteins